George Evans may refer to:

Arts and entertainment
 George "Honey Boy" Evans (1870–1915), American songwriter and entertainer
 George Evans (bandleader) (1915–1993), English jazz bandleader, arranger and tenor saxophonist
 George Evans (singer) (born 1963), Canadian-American jazz vocalist
 George Evans, pseudonym of Frederick Schiller Faust (1892–1944), American author known as Max Brand
 George Bird Evans (1906–1998), American author, artist and dog breeder
 George Ewart Evans (1909–1988), Welsh-born schoolteacher, writer and folklorist
 George Evans (cartoonist) (1920–2001), American comic book artist

Politics
 George Evans (1655–1720), Anglo-Irish politician
 George Evans, 1st Baron Carbery (c. 1680–1749), Anglo-Irish politician
 George Evans, 2nd Baron Carbery (died 1759), British politician and Irish peer
 George Evans, 3rd Baron Carbery (died 1783), Anglo-Irish peer
 George Evans, 4th Baron Carbery (1766–1804), British politician
 George Evans (American politician) (1797–1867), American congressman
 George Evans (Australian politician) (1802–1868), politician in Victoria, Australia
 George Henry Evans (1805–1855), American radical reformer
 George Hampden Evans (died 1842), Irish politician
 George S. Evans (1826–1883), Texas Ranger, miner, businessman and political official

Sports
 Rosser Evans (George Rosser Evans, 1867–?), Wales international rugby union player
 George Evans (rugby league) (1941–2015), Australian rugby league player
 George Evans (footballer, born 1864) (1864–1947), English football player (Manchester United)
 George Evans (footballer, born 1935) (1935–2000), Welsh football player
 George Evans (footballer, born 1994), English football player (Millwall)
 Chick Evans (coach) (1901–1976), American football, basketball, and baseball coach
 George Evans (basketball) (born 1971), American basketball player
 George Evans (cricketer) (1915–1965), Australian cricketer

Other
 George Evans (antiquary) (1630–1702), English antiquary
 George Evans (explorer) (1780–1852), Australian explorer
 George Essex Evans (1863–1909), Australian journalist
 George Evans (VC) (1876–1937), British Army officer
 George Roche Evans (1922–1985), American Catholic bishop

See also
 Sir George De Lacy Evans (1787–1870), British general